is a 1988 Japanese historical television series. It is the 26th NHK Taiga drama.

Plot
The series focuses on the life of Takeda Shingen.

Production
Sword fight arranger - Kunishirō Hayashi

Cast

Takeda clan
Kiichi Nakai as Takeda Shingen
Claude Maki as young Shingen and Takeda Katsuyori
Mikijirō Hira as Takeda Nobutora, Shingen's father
Ayako Wakao as Lady Ōi, Shingen's mother (series narrator)
Misako Konno as Lady Sanjō, Shingen's wife
Mayumi Ogawa as Yae
Yoko Minamino as Okoko and Koihime
Mao Daichi as Satomi
Kimiko Ikegami as Eri
Takeshi Wakamatsu as Takeda Nobushige
Masaru Shinozuka as Takeda Nobukado
Shinichi Tsutsumi as Takeda Yoshinobu
Nakamura Shichinosuke II as young Yoshinobu
Katsuya Kobayashi as Hara Masatoshi
Kei Satō as Abe Katsuyoshi
Taketoshi Naito as Gishū
"Twenty-Four Generals of Takeda Shingen"
Joe Shishido as Hara Toratane
Kiyoshi Kodama as Obu Toramasa
Ryōsuke Miki as Baba Nobuharu
Kōjirō Hongō as Amari Torayasu
Bunta Sugawara as Itagaki Nobukata
Hiroaki Murakami as Kōsaka "Danjō" Masanobu
Isao Hashizume as Sanada Yukitaka
Saburō Shinoda as Yamagata Masakage
Toshiyuki Nishida as Yamamoto Kansuke

Uesugi clan
Kyōhei Shibata as Uesugi Kenshin, Shingen's rival
Ken Utsui as Naoe Kagetsuna
Yūsuke Takita as Uesugi Norimasa
Tokuma Nishioka as Kitajō Takahiro
Hiroshi Katsuno as Ōkuma Tomohide

Imagawa clan
Nakamura Kankurō V as Imagawa Yoshimoto
Kyōko Kishida as Jukeini
Ichirō Zaitsu as Taigen Sessai

Later Hōjō clan
Ryōtarō Sugi as Hōjō Ujiyasu
Yūichi Aoyama as Hōjō Ujimasa
Mai Okamoto as Oume
Takao Inoue as Matsuda Norihide

Oda clan
Ryo Ishibashi as Oda Nobunaga
Yumi Asō as Nōhime
Tsuyoshi Ihara as Oda Nobuyuki

Tokugawa clan
Nakamura Hashinosuke III as Tokugawa Ieyasu
Shinshō Nakamaru as Sakai Tadatsugu

Suwa clan
Bandō Yasosuke V as Suwa Yorishige
Yorie Yamashita as Nene Goryōnin

Murakami clan
Tsunehiko Kamijō as Murakami Yoshikiyo

Others
Ichikawa Danzō IX as Ashikaga Yoshiaki, the last shogun of the Ashikaga shogunate

TV schedule

References

External links
Official Site

Taiga drama
1988 Japanese television series debuts
1988 Japanese television series endings
Cultural depictions of Takeda Shingen
Cultural depictions of Sanada clan
Cultural depictions of Uesugi Kenshin
Cultural depictions of Oda Nobunaga
Cultural depictions of Tokugawa Ieyasu
Television shows based on Japanese novels
Television series set in the 16th century
Television shows set in Yamanashi Prefecture